Roby is a village in the Metropolitan Borough of Knowsley, Merseyside, England. It was previously administratively linked with its neighbour Huyton by the Huyton-with-Roby civil parish and Huyton with Roby Urban District. Like Huyton, Roby is effectively a dormitory village or suburb of the neighbouring City of Liverpool. At the 2001 Census, the population of Roby was 9,353, (4,511 males, 4,842 females). reducing to 7,254 at the 2011 Census.  Roby is the location of the sixth form centre of Knowsley Community College.

History
Roby grew from a tenth-century Norse settlement named Rabil, meaning "boundary farm/village". Roby is therefore mentioned, as Rabil, in the Domesday Book of 1086. In 1351, it became part of the Barony of Widnes and subsequently merged into the Duchy of Lancaster.

Governance
In 1894 Roby was included in the Huyton with Roby Urban District.  On the abolition of the administrative county of Lancashire in 1974, the urban district was also abolished and its former area was transferred to Merseyside to be combined with that of other districts to form the present-day metropolitan borough of Knowsley.

Geography
The area is located within a green belt area of Merseyside and partly consists of detached houses and private roads such as Wynwood Park. It has a golf course situated in nearby Bowring Park by the M62 motorway and Roby Road.

A new instated sign marks Roby by the Bowring Park Golf Course, including Roby Station and Roby Road within its location.

Transport
Roby railway station is situated on the Liverpool City Line, between the stations of Broadgreen and Huyton.

TV and radio
The Boys from the Blackstuff episode "Jobs for the Boys" was part filmed in Woodlands Road, Roby

See also
Listed buildings in Huyton with Roby

References

External links

Towns and villages in the Metropolitan Borough of Knowsley
Liverpool Urban Area